William Jacob Demko (December 20, 1895 – August 8, 1957) was a U.S. soccer defender who was a member of the U.S. soccer team at the 1924 Summer Olympics.  Demko earned two cap with the U.S. national team in 1924.  While Demko was a member of the U.S. team at the Olympics, he did not play in the two U.S. games.  However, following the tournament, the U.S. had two exhibition games.  Demko played in both, a win over Poland and a loss to Ireland.  .

He was born in Philadelphia, Pennsylvania.

References

1895 births
1957 deaths
American soccer players
United States men's international soccer players
Olympic soccer players of the United States
Footballers at the 1924 Summer Olympics
Soccer players from Philadelphia
Association football defenders